Dharampal Singh Yadav (2 April 1942 – 26 April 2021) was an Indian politician. He led the Indian National Congress. He was elected M.L.A. thrice from Sohna – 60 assembly Constituency in 1987, 1991 and 2000 and was the MLA from Badshahpur. He was a Minister in the Haryana Government from 1991 to 1996.

He became vice-president of Haryana Pradesh Congress Committee in 1997. A proposal to establish an OBC Cell led by Dharampal was passed with Sonia Gandhi's approval.

Early life
Dharampal Yadav was born in Sirhol, a village in Gurgaon District of South Haryana. His father, Sh. Maha Ram Yadav, was a freedom fighter and had served for years with Sh. Subhash Chandra Bose in Indian National Army.

He completed his Bachelor's degree in Arts and completed a Diploma in Automobiles. He took over the family business and mixed social work with business.

He was jailed with Indira Gandhi in 1978 during the Jail Bharo Andolan.

Political career
His political career started in 1987 when, after he was denied an Assembly position from Sohna by Congress, he contested as an independent against the incumbent and won. However, he joined Congress in 1991 when it offered him the ticket. He participated in Indian general election, 2014 (Haryana) and became part of Gurgaon (Lok Sabha constituency).

Personal life
Dharampal Yadav was married to Smt. Vidya Devi in 1963. They had four children: Virender Yadav, Surander Yadav, Geeta Yadav and Sarita Yadav.

He actively participated in social activities associated with "Indira Gandhi Children holiday Home" at Damdama and was a member of Lions and Rotary Clubs.

He died of COVID-19-related illness in Gurgaon on 26 April 2021.

Positions held
1991 – 1992 – Minister of Housing Board (Haryana Govt.)
1992 – 1994 – Minister of Animal Husbandry (Haryana Govt.)
1994 – 1996 – Minister of Environment & Forest (Haryana Govt.)

See also
 Bhupinder Singh Hooda
 Manmohan Singh
 Sonia Gandhi
 Badshahpur
 Gurgaon

References

2021 deaths
1942 births
People from Gurgaon
Haryana MLAs 2009–2014
Haryana MLAs 2019–2024
Deaths from the COVID-19 pandemic in India
Indian National Congress politicians